Membrane-bound transcription factor site-1 protease, or site-1 protease (S1P) for short, also known as subtilisin/kexin-isozyme 1 (SKI-1), is an enzyme (EC 3.4.21.112) that in humans is encoded by the MBTPS1 gene. S1P cleaves the endoplasmic reticulum loop of sterol regulatory element-binding protein (SREBP) transcription factors.

Function 

This gene encodes a member of the subtilisin-like proprotein convertase family, which includes proteases that process protein and peptide precursors trafficking through regulated or constitutive branches of the secretory pathway. The encoded protein undergoes an initial autocatalytic processing event in the endoplasmic reticulum (ER) to generate a heterodimer which exits the ER and sorts to the cis/medial-Golgi where a second autocatalytic event takes place and the catalytic activity is acquired. It encodes a type 1 membrane bound protease which is ubiquitously expressed and regulates cholesterol or lipid homeostasis via cleavage of substrates at non-basic residues.

Clinical significance 

Mutations in this gene may be associated with lysosomal dysfunction.

See also 
 Membrane-bound transcription factor site-2 protease

References

External links 
 

EC 3.4.21